Mikro globulus is a species of sea snail, a marine gastropod mollusk in the family Skeneidae.

Description
The shell grows to a length of 1 mm.

Distribution
This marine species occurs off Hatton Bank, Northeast Atlantic Ocean and off southern Iceland

References

 Warén A. (1996). New and little known mollusca from Iceland and Scandinavia. Part 3. Sarsia 81: 197–245
 Gofas, S.; Le Renard, J.; Bouchet, P. (2001). Mollusca, in: Costello, M.J. et al. (Ed.) (2001). European register of marine species: a check-list of the marine species in Europe and a bibliography of guides to their identification. Collection Patrimoines Naturels, 50: pp. 180–213

External links
 

globulus
Gastropods described in 1996